The Secret History of Our Streets is a BBC documentary series that examined the social history of streets.  It was a co-production between the BBC and The Open University.

The first series showed how London has changed since Charles Booth's survey of social conditions began in 1886, while the second series focused on three streets in Scotland.

Episode list

Series one

 Arnold Circus, Bethnal Green
 Caledonian Road, Islington
 Camberwell Grove, Southwark
 Deptford High Street, south east London
 Portland Road, Notting Hill
 Reverdy Road, Bermondsey

Series two

A second series examined the history of three streets and estates in Scotland:
 The Fittie Squares, Aberdeen
 Duke Street, Glasgow
 The Moray Estate, Edinburgh

See also
 A House Through Time

References

External links
 

The Secret History Of Our Streets – BBC TV blog.

2012 British television series debuts
BBC television documentaries
1886 in London
Social history of London